The Vietnam Basketball Association, often abbreviated as VBA, is a Vietnamese national professional basketball league founded in 2016.

History
The formation of the VBA was announced by charter team Saigon Heat following their completion of the 2015–16 ASEAN Basketball League season. Leading up to the inaugural season, the VBA expected 6 teams would compete in the new league. However, only 5 teams were officially unveiled. To oversee league operations, the VBA looked to the Philippines to find someone with an extensive basketball background. Tonichi Pujante was named the inaugural league commissioner. In January 2020, the VBA announced that the upcoming season would feature one additional team located in the province of Khanh Hoa on the Southern Coast of Vietnam. The team reportedly was going to play in the 2019 season tournament, but plans fell through. The new team is unofficially called the "Nha Trang Dolphins."

Teams

The VBA started its inaugural season with 5 teams. The league added the Thang Long Warriors as its 6th franchise in the 2017 season.

Going into the 2020 season, the VBA added the Nha Trang Dolphins in Nha Trang, Khánh Hòa as its 7th franchise.

Regular season
Following the summer break, the preseason begins typically in May. During this time, the teams build their 13–16-man rosters with each team allowed one foreign, two Overseas Vietnamese, and 10–13 local players. The VBA regular season currently begins at the beginning of June and runs to the end of the September. Each team plays 12 games, divided between 6 home and 6 away matches.

At the end of the regular season, the league's overall leader is awarded the Fans' Shield.

Playoffs
At the conclusion of the regular, the VBA Playoffs begins. In the inaugural season, all 5 teams are eligible for the tournament style playoffs. However, the teams that finish in the #4 and #5 seeds must meet each other in a wildcard game to move on to the playoffs. The winner of the game meets the #1 seeded team. In the 2017 season onward, there are 6 teams, and the wildcard game is eliminated. #1 will play #4 and the #2 seeded team meets the #3 seeded team in a best-of-three series. The winners move on to meet in the VBA Finals.

Champions 

Current teams that have no VBA Finals appearances:
Nha Trang Dolphins

See also
 Sport in Vietnam
 Vietnam national basketball team

References

External links
 
 
 

 
2016 establishments in Vietnam
Basketball competitions in Vietnam
Basketball leagues in Asia
Sports leagues established in 2016
Sports leagues in Vietnam